Amargar (Middle Persian: āmārgar) was a Sasanian administrative office which corresponded to a type of tax collector or chief fiscal officer. The amargar could administer several towns, or even a province, such as Kirman or Pars. The Eran-amargar was in charge of the financial affairs of the whole empire.

References

Sources 
 
 

Positions of authority
Sasanian administrative offices
Persian words and phrases